Cherry Flavor Night Time is the debut album of Amnesia, released on March 11, 1997 through Supreme Recordings. A limited edition bonus disc contained a remix of the entire album by Brad Laner under his moniker Electric Company.

Track listing

Personnel 
Matt Devine – guitar on "If You Come Around" and "Cherry Flavor Night Time"
Brad Laner – instruments, production, engineering, mixing
Josh Laner – drums on "Undergarden Song"
Eddy Schreyer – mastering

References

External links 
 

1997 debut albums
Amnesia (band) albums